Smith & Wesson M&P ("Military & Police") is a line of semi-automatic pistols by manufacturer Smith & Wesson.

Smith & Wesson M&P may also refer to:

Pistols
Smith & Wesson M&P22, a rimfire pistol styled after the full-sized M&P
M&P Bodyguard 380, a subcompact centerfire pistol

Rifles
Smith & Wesson M&P15, a centerfire AR-type rifle
Smith & Wesson M&P15-22, a rimfire rifle styled after the AR-15

Revolvers
Smith & Wesson Model 10, an older name of the Smith & Wesson Model 10 mid-size revolver used from 1899 to 1957
M&P Bodyguard 38, a subcompact centerfire revolver
Smith & Wesson M&P R8, a SWAT revolver from the Performance Center